is a passenger railway station located in the city of Tsuyama, Okayama Prefecture, Japan, operated by West Japan Railway Company (JR West).

Lines

Station layout
The station consists of two opposed ground-level side platforms connected to the station building by a level crossing. The station is unattended.

Platforms

Adjacent stations

History
Tsuboi Station opened on August 21, 1923. With the privatization of the Japan National Railways (JNR) on April 1, 1987, the station came under the aegis of the West Japan Railway Company.

Passenger statistics
In fiscal 2019, the station was used by an average of 24 passengers daily..

Surrounding area
 Japan National Route 181
 Chugoku Expressway
 Tsuyama Municipal Nakasho Elementary School

See also
List of railway stations in Japan

References

External links

  Tsuboi Station Official Site

Railway stations in Okayama Prefecture
Kishin Line
Railway stations in Japan opened in 1923
Tsuyama